Joanna of Naples may refer to:

 Joanna I of Naples (1325–1382)
 Joanna II of Naples (1373–1435)
 Joanna of Aragon, Queen of Naples (1454–1517), wife of Ferdinand I of Naples
 Joanna of Naples (1478–1518), also queen consort of Ferdinand II of Naples

See also
Joanna of Aragon (disambiguation)